Karangtengah Station (KE) is a class III railway station located at Ciheulang Tonggoh, Cibadak, Sukabumi Regency, West Java, Indonesia. The station, which is located at an altitude of +447 m, is included in the Operation Area I Jakarta.

Initially this station only had two railway tracks with track 1 as a straight line, but because nowadays there are almost no crosses between trains, track 2 was demolished and turned into a small park.

Services 
The following is a list of train services at the Karangtengah Station.

Passenger services
 Mixed class
 Pangrango, towards  and towards  (executive-economy)

References

External links
 

Sukabumi Regency
Railway stations in West Java
Railway stations opened in 1882